State Highway 126 (abbreviated SH-126) was a state highway in McClain County, Oklahoma. It ran from SH-76 north of Dibble to SH-24 in Washington, paralleling SH-74B.

SH-126 existed as a state highway for about ten years, from 1956 to 1966. After it was decommissioned, it was given to McClain County. The road is currently signed as 240th Street in McClain County's 9-1-1 road naming system. Before this, it was commonly referred to as Washington Road.

Route description
SH-126 began at what is now the intersection of SH-76 and 240th Street. It proceeded east from this intersection along 240th Street. At present-day May Avenue, the highway turned south to cross Dibble Creek, a tributary of Walnut Creek. After crossing the bridge, the highway continued east on 240th Street, crossing Sandy Creek, another tributary of Walnut Creek. The route then ended at SH-24 on the western outskirts of Washington.

History
SH-126 first appears on the 1957 Oklahoma state highway map, implying it was added to the state highway system the year prior. As of 1958, the highway in its entirety was composed of gravel. By the following year, the east half of the highway had been paved. The highway remained in this state until 1966, when it was removed from the state highway system and turned over to McClain County.

Junction list

References

126